Calytrix tetragona is an Australian shrub in the myrtle family. Common names include common fringe-myrtle.

Description
It is a widespread plant growing in many parts of southern Australia. It ranges from high rainfall areas to semi-arid zones. It is found on skeletal or sandy soils. It can be used as a garden plant.

References

tetragona
Flora of New South Wales
Flora of Queensland
Flora of Tasmania
Flora of South Australia
Flora of Victoria (Australia)
Myrtales of Australia
Rosids of Western Australia
Taxa named by Jacques Labillardière
Garden plants of Australia